Sean Lee Murphy is a retired United States Air Force major general who last served as the Deputy Surgeon General of the United States Air Force. Previously, he was the Command Surgeon of the Air Combat Command. Raised in Oxon Hill, Maryland, Murphy graduated from the United States Air Force Academy in 1981 with a B.S. degree in biology. He then went on to earn his M.D. degree from the Uniformed Services University of the Health Sciences in 1985 and to complete his residency in pediatrics at the Air Force Medical Center at Keesler Air Force Base in 1988.

References

External links
 

Year of birth missing (living people)
Living people
Place of birth missing (living people)
People from Oxon Hill, Maryland
United States Air Force Academy alumni
Uniformed Services University of the Health Sciences alumni
American pediatricians
United States Air Force Medical Corps officers
United States Air Force generals
People from Reno, Nevada